Quartet-Quintet is an album by American jazz pianist Hank Jones recorded in 1955 for the Savoy label.

Reception

Allmusic awarded the album 3 stars. The Penguin Guide to Jazz described the band's "bright, hard-edged sound that is enhanced by a faithful, hiss-free reproduction. A hint of echo in the acoustic adds some depth to spacious uncomplicated arrangements".

Track listing
 "Almost Like Being in Love" (Frederick Loewe, Alan Jay Lerner) - 4:35
 "An Evening at Papa Joe's" (Ozzie Cadena) - 15:05
 "And Then Some" (Cadena) - 7:30
 "Summer's Gone" (Cadena) - 7:15
 "Don't Blame Me" (Jimmy McHugh, Dorothy Fields) - 6:30

Personnel 
Hank Jones - piano
Donald Byrd - trumpet
Eddie Jones - bass
Kenny Clarke - drums
Matty Dice - trumpet (tracks 2 & 3)

References 

1955 albums
Hank Jones albums
Savoy Records albums
Albums produced by Ozzie Cadena
Albums recorded at Van Gelder Studio